Landsat 7 is the seventh satellite of the Landsat program. Launched on 15 April 1999, Landsat 7's primary goal is to refresh the global archive of satellite photos, providing up-to-date and cloud-free images. The Landsat program is managed and operated by the United States Geological Survey, and data from Landsat 7 is collected and distributed by the USGS. The NASA WorldWind project allows 3D images from Landsat 7 and other sources to be freely navigated and viewed from any angle. The satellite's companion, Earth Observing-1, trailed by one minute and followed the same orbital characteristics, but in 2011 its fuel was depleted and EO-1's orbit began to degrade. Landsat 7 was built by Lockheed Martin Space Systems.

In 2016, NASA announced plans to attempt the first ever refueling of a live satellite by refueling Landsat 7 in 2020 with the OSAM-1 mission; as of 2021, the launch date has slipped to 2025.

NASA decommissioned the satellite following the 2021 launch and activation of Landsat 9.

Satellite specifications 

Landsat 7 was designed to last for five years, and has the capacity to collect and transmit up to 532 images per day. It is in a polar, sun-synchronous orbit, meaning it scans across the entire Earth's surface. With an altitude of 705 km, it takes 232 orbits, or 16 days, to do so. The satellite weighs 1973 kg, is 4.04 m long, and 2.74 m in diameter. Unlike its predecessors, Landsat 7 has a solid-state memory of 378 Gbits (roughly 100 images). The main instrument on board Landsat 7 is the Enhanced Thematic Mapper Plus (ETM+), a whisk broom scanner image sensor.

Instruments 
 A panchromatic band with 15 metre spatial resolution (band 8)
 Visible (reflected light) bands in the spectrum of blue, green, red, near-infrared (NIR), and mid-infrared (MIR) with 30 metre spatial resolution (bands 1–5, 7)
 A thermal infrared channel with 60 metre spatial resolution (band 6)
 Full aperture, 5% absolute radiometric calibration

Scan Line Corrector failure 

On 31 May 2003, the Scan Line Corrector (SLC) in the ETM+ instrument failed. The SLC consists of a pair of small mirrors that rotate about an axis in tandem with the motion of the main ETM+ scan mirror. The purpose of the SLC is to compensate for the forward motion (along-track) of the spacecraft so that the resulting scans are aligned parallel to each other. Without the effects of the SLC, the instrument images the Earth in a "zig-zag" fashion, resulting in some areas that are imaged twice and others that are not imaged at all. The net effect is that approximately 22% of the data in a Landsat 7 scene is missing when acquired without a functional SLC.

A month after the SLC failure, the USGS compiled an assessment of the degraded data produced with the failed SLC. The assessment included input from scientists from USGS, NASA, and the Landsat 7 science team, and concluded that the results were still usable for many scientific applications and that there were several potential approaches to compensate for the missing data.

Satellite imagery 

In August 1998, NASA contracted EarthSat to produce Landsat GeoCover (Geocover 2000 in NASA WorldWind) — a positionally accurate orthorectified Landsat Thematic Mapper and Multispectral Scanner imagery covering the majority of the Earth's land mass. The contract was part of the NASA Scientific Data Purchase which was administrated through NASA's John C. Stennis Space Center. GeoCover was later enhanced to EarthSat NaturalVue, a simulated natural color Landsat 7 derived circa year 2000, orthorectified, mosaicked and color balanced digital image dataset. Other commercial simulated true color 15-metre global imagery products built from the NASA Landsat 7 imagery include TerraColor from Earthstar Geographics, TruEarth (found in Google Earth and Google Maps) from TerraMetrics, BrightEarth from ComputaMaps, simulated natural color from Atlogis and a product of i-cubed used in NASA WorldWind.

Large parts of the Earth surface displayed on web mapping services like Google Maps / Google Earth, MSN Maps or Yahoo! Maps are based on enhanced and color balanced Landsat 7 imagery.

Decommissioning 
Landsat 7 required regular orbital maneuvers to ensure that the local mean time (LMT) data acquisitions were maintained. The final such maneuver took place on February 7, 2017. From that point forward, the satellite's orbit began to slowly degrade (lower) such that by 2021 it had faded from the desired 10:00 AM LMT to about 9:15 AM.

With the September 27, 2021 launch of Landsat 9, Landsat 7 is to be decommissioned. Its orbit has degraded such that Landsat 9 can move into the 705-km ) “standard” orbit altitude, and take Landsat 7's place in an orbit that allows data to be collected eight days out of phase with Landsat 8 (with two satellites in orbit, a Landsat scene is collected over every location on Earth every eight days). Landsat 7's 9:15 AM LMT acquisition will preclude acquiring high-quality and heritage-continuing data.

On April 6, 2022, the science mission ended and the image sensor was placed into standby mode as the satellite's orbit was lowered.

NASA is exploring the possibility of using NASA's Restore-L Robotic Servicing Mission 27 to refuel Landsat 7,  primarily to ensure successful decommissioning, but also to provide the possibility of turning the satellite into a transfer radiometer. This would allow it to act as a calibration instrument for Landsats 8 and 9, and perhaps even extend its scientific utility.

See also 

 Google Earth
 NASA WorldWind
 Virtual globe
 UNIFORM-1

References

External links 
 NASA's Landsat 7 Website
 Landsat 7 Science Data Users Handbook
 The USGS' Landsat Website
 
 NASA's World Wind Project
 List of Landsat layers available in World Wind
 NASA Applied Sciences Directorate website for free viewing/download of Landsat GeoCover band 742 mosaics
 University of Maryland Global Land Cover Facility for free viewing/download of individual Landsat images, GeoCover mosaics, and other earth imagery data
 Harris GLOBE15 - Harris Corporation Geospatial website (includes 15m global data set details)
 EarthSat's NaturalVue 2000: Global natural color satellite imagery coverage (resolution 15 m), based on Landsat 7 data acquired between 1999 and 2001
 TerraColor.Net - TerraColor 15m imagery website
 TruEarth 15m imagery website
 ICEDS Webserver, a free WMS compliant webserver, serving a variety of Geographic data including Landsat images
 Atlogis Maps and Atlogis Meta-Maps: Online-Viewer for Landsat 5 and Landsat 7 Natural Color Mosaic
 CEOS MIM Database Landsat 7 Entry

Spacecraft launched in 1999
Spacecraft launched by Delta II rockets
Landsat program
Earth observation satellites of the United States
NASA satellites orbiting Earth